The women's doubles Tournament at the 2006 Italian Open took place between 8 May and 22 May on the outdoor clay courts of the Foro Italico in Rome, Italy. Daniela Hantuchová and Ai Sugiyama won the title, defeating Francesca Schiavone and Květa Peschke in the final.

Seeds

Draw

Finals

Top half

Bottom half

References
 Main Draw

Italian Open - Doubles
Women's Doubles